Longtang Town is an urban town in and subdivision of Lianyuan, Hunan Province, People's Republic of China.

Administrative division
The town is divided into 65 villages, the following areas: 
 
 Changchong Village
 Shuizhu Village
 Fuhong Village
 Qunli Village
 Matou Village
 Wenxin Village
 Shitai Village
 Hesheng Village
 Hexi Village
 Yunxiao Village
 Zhumei Village
 Dongbian Village
 Hedong Village
 Shilu Village
 Xinquan Village
 Jiangkou Village
 Shuangsheng Village
 Shangbai Village
 Kuanjia Village
 Maotangwan Village
 Shangshitang Village
 Longtang Village
 Dongting Village
 Zhanjiang Village
 Fengmu Village
 Zhekou Village
 Jingbian Village
 Daping Village
 Mafang Village
 Helian Village
 Qixin Village
 Donghua Village
 Dongchong Village
 Qibao Village
 Baiyang Village
 Taomei Village
 Lishanwan Village
 Leimingtang Village
 Zhexi Village
 Liuhe Village
 Lianhua Village
 Helin Village
 Xiexing Village
 Xiaxing Village
 Zhaoyi Village
 Wenli Village
 Jianxing Village
 Shexing Village
 Guantang Village
 Xinshiqiao Village
 Gaoxing Village
 Cha'ao Village
 Nanfeng Village
 Pingli Village
 Wailang Village
 Baimei Village
 Wenji Village
 Shuanghe Village
 Shilu Village
 Dihua Village
 Luojia Village
 Wocao Village
 Hongxing Village
 Dongjia Village
 Jinji Village

External links

Divisions of Lianyuan